Aros Castle, also known as Dounarwyse Castle, is a ruined 13th-century castle near Salen on the Isle of Mull, Scotland. The castle overlooks the Sound of Mull.

The castle was initially a stronghold of the Clan MacDougall. When they backed the losing side in the dispute between John Balliol and Robert de Bruys, their lands were declared forfeit and the castle was transferred to Clan Donald. When, some centuries later, the latter tried to conquer Scotland, they too had their lands declared forfeit, and this time Clan Maclean gained the Castle at MacDonald expense.

It is a scheduled monument that includes the 13th-century hall-house and bailey with traces of other buildings, possibly of a later date, and a small stone-built boat landing east of the bailey. The structure appears to have comprised two main storeys and a part attic. The castle was probably built by one of the MacDougall lords of Lorn in the 13th century. Documentary evidence from the late 14th century records it as Dounarwyse Castle in the possession of the Lords of the Isles. Lord Ochiltree entertained the Island Chiefs here in 1608 before making them prisoners. It was described as 'ruinous, old, useless and never of any strength' in 1688 but seems to have been garrisoned by Argyll's troops in 1690. No evidence exists of any occupation in the 18th century or later.

References

Royal Commission on the Ancient and Historical Monuments of Scotland listing - Aros Castle, CANMORE
 Mike Salter, Castles of Western and Northern Scotland 1995

Buildings and structures on the Isle of Mull
Ruined castles in Argyll and Bute
Scheduled Ancient Monuments in Argyll and Bute